A caul is a historical headress worn by women that covers tied-up hair. A fancy caul could be made of satin, velvet, fine silk or brocade, although a simple caul would commonly be made of white linen or cotton. The caul could be covered by a crespine or a hairnet to secure it from falling off.

During the second half of the thirteenth century, network caps, more properly called "cauls", came into fashion for ladies' wear. These headdresses were shaped like bags, made of gold, silver or silk network. At first they fitted  fairly close to the head, the edge, band or rim being placed high up on the forehead, to show some hair on the temples and around the nape; they enclosed the head and hair, and were secured by a circlet or fillet. Jewels were often set at intervals in the band, also at the intersections of the cross-bars.

References

External links
 A Crowning Glory: Hairstyles and Headwear In Venice
 Medieval Woman's Hairstyles & Headwear 1327–1485

Fashion accessories
Headgear